The Daily Jang is an Urdu newspaper headquartered in Karachi, Pakistan. It is the oldest newspaper of Pakistan in continuous publication since its foundation in 1939, first published during World War II, hence the name (Jang) translating to "war" in Urdu. Its current group chief executive and editor-in-chief is Mir Shakil-ur-Rahman. Past editors and contributors have included Mahmood Shaam, Nazir Naji and Shafi Aqeel. 

Its current list of columnists includes Saleem Safi, Hassan Nisar, Ghazi Salahuddin, Wajahat Masood, Hafeezullah Niazi, Irshad Bhatti, Mazhar Barlas, Ataul Haq Qasmi, Ansar Abbasi, Anwar Ghazi, Ali Moeen Nawazish and Yasir Pirzada. 

Jang is published by the Jang Group of Newspapers.  It was originally published as a weekly to raise political awareness among Muslims living in British India. The group's flagship Daily Jang is Pakistan's most prominent Urdu daily newspaper. The group also owns Geo News, arguably the most popular news channel in Pakistan. 

It is published from Karachi, Lahore, Rawalpindi, Quetta, Multan and London.

References

External links
 
 Jang Epaper
 Jang English

1946 establishments in India
Newspapers established in 1946
Daily newspapers published in Pakistan
Mass media in Karachi
Urdu-language newspapers published in Pakistan
Conservatism in Pakistan